Sunday Street may refer to:

 "Sunday Street" (song), a 1991 song by Squeeze
 Sunday Street (album), a 1976 album by Dave Van Ronk